Gonzalo Eugenio García (born May 12, 1967) is an Argentine professional basketball coach.

Coaching career

Pro clubs
García was the head coach of Gimnasia-Indalo Esgr.Comodoro Rivadavia, of Argentina’s top-tier level Liga Nacional de Básquet (LNB), from 2009 to 2017. In 2017, García was named Argentina’s co-basketball coach of the year.

National teams
García has worked as an assistant coach of the senior Argentine national basketball team.

References

External links
REALGM.com Profile
Latinbasket.com Profile

1967 births
Living people
Argentine basketball coaches
Basketball coaches
Flamengo basketball coaches
People from San Martín, Buenos Aires
San Lorenzo de Almagro basketball coaches
Sportspeople from Buenos Aires Province